Ilek is the name of several places:

Ilek (river), a tributary of the Ural in Russia and Kazakhstan
Ilek, Chelyabinsk Oblast, a selo in Ileksky Selsoviet of Ashinsky District of Chelyabinsk Oblast, Russia
Ilek, Kursk Oblast, a selo in Ilkovsky Selsoviet of Belovsky District of Kursk Oblast, Russia
Ilek, Orenburg Oblast, a selo in Ileksky Selsoviet of Ileksky District of Orenburg Oblast, Russia